The Life Application Study Bible is a Study Bible published by both Tyndale House and Zondervan Publishers. It features extensive notes, book introductions, character studies, articles, commentary, maps and charts. It is available in multiple translations, in both English and Spanish (Biblia de estudio del diario vivir), and is advertised as "today's number one selling study Bible".

Available English Editions
New Living Translation
New International Version
King James Version
New King James Version
New American Standard Bible
Holman Christian Standard Bible

Available Spanish Editions
Nueva Traducción Viviente
Reina-Valera (1960 revision)

Past Editions
The Living Bible
New Revised Standard Version

External links
Tyndale House Publishers website
Zondervan Publisher website

Study Bibles